Brenda Margaret Almond (19 September 1937 – 14 January 2023) was a British philosopher, known for her work on philosophy of education and applied ethics. She was an elected member of the Austrian Academy of Sciences.

Biography 
Almond co-founded the Society for Applied Philosophy in 1982 with her then colleague at Surrey University Anthony O'Hear and co-founded the International Journal of Applied Philosophy in 1983  part of a conscious strategy of moving philosophy away from abstract and abstruse debates towards issues that affect people in their everyday lives. Almond’s writing highlights issues like health and family and social relations. In 1987, at a time when HIV/AIDS was still barely understood, she wrote in The Times on the difficult balance of health and safety over risk and freedom. “What is clear”, she wrote, “is that in the absence of a vaccine or cure, the virus will increasingly move towards the centre of the world stage”. Almond went on to write a book setting out key debates in the area called AIDS: A Moral Issue (MacMillan) in 1990. Among the topics discussed here are confidentiality, autonomy and welfare, the role of the media, legal implications of infection in Britain and the US, coping with the threat of death, along with some theological reflections.

Almond also organised and reported on academic conferences on the issue including one held at Surrey University in 1986 focussing on medical confidentiality and discrimination  and the Third International Conference on AIDS in Washington in 1987.

In later years, Almond moved on to issues such as biotechnologies and even debates about who and what constituted a “legitimate target” during a war. In an opinion piece for the magazine Philosophy Now she accused fellow philosophers of still preferring to “stick to tired and familiar academic debates while the world burns”.

Almond was later a professor emeritus at Hull University.

Almond argued that ultimately the freedom to opt out of the education system altogether must be protected, as well as the freedom to choose a religious education in a secular state, or a secular education in a religious state in Education and the Individual, (written when she was in her thirties, under her married name), and went on to write Moral Concerns, The Philosophical Quest and Exploring Ethics: A Traveller's Tale and The Fragmenting Family. As part of a personal profile of Almond, the Times Higher Education Supplement says "she argues that the family is about more than stability in the present: it is about the past and the future" and notes that the book emphasises G. K. Chesterton's description of the family as "this frail cord, flung from the forgotten hills of yesterday to the invisible mountains of tomorrow".

As well as being a philosophy professor, Almond sought to present her particular view of individual rights to a wider public. She argued regularly for maintenance of the “welfare of the child provision” when legislation was crafted to reflect the changing technologies of birth and raised ethical issues surrounding the use of human embryos.

Ailsa Stevens wrote in an article that appeared in BioNews that Almond, "felt that anxieties over hybrid embryo research had been fuelled by confusion over the definition of an embryo".

Almond died in Sussex on 14 January 2023, at the age of 85. In an appreciation published by The Guardian, her son Martin Cohen noted that her "authentic voice" was to be found in her best-known title, The Philosophical Quest (1990), a mix of conventional, essentially educational, summaries of the core themes of philosophy, alongside more fluid, creative passages in which the narrator records receiving philosophical letters from a mysterious correspondent called Sophia, even as her later writing centred on defence of the "traditional family" from both social and technological changes.

Selected publications

Awards and honors 
She was awarded an Honorary doctorate by the University of Utrecht in 1998. In 1999 she was named an elected member of the Austrian Academy of Sciences.

References 

1937 births
2023 deaths
20th-century British philosophers
21st-century British philosophers
Alumni of University College London
British women philosophers
English philosophers
Environmental ethicists
Members of the Austrian Academy of Sciences
Academics of the University of Hull
People from Liverpool